Live from WDST Acoustic Breakfast is a live recording of Gandalf Murphy and the Slambovian Circus of Dreams' appearance at 8:00am on December 2, 2000 on the Acoustic Breakfast radio show in WDST in Kingston, NY.

This was a limited production CD which was sold only at live shows. It is currently out of print.

Track listing
"Silent Revolution"
"Genius"
"Baby Jane"
"Circus of Dreams"
"Talkin' to the Buddha"

See also
 

Gandalf Murphy and the Slambovian Circus of Dreams albums
2000 live albums